HMS Snipe was a modified Black Swan-class sloop of the Royal Navy. She was laid down by William Denny and Brothers, Dumbarton on 21 September 1944, launched on 20 December 1945 and commissioned on 9 September 1946, with the pennant number U20.

Construction and career
Commissioned in 1946, HMS Snipe therefore did not experience the battles of World War II.

HMS Snipe served in the Royal Navy for the North America and West Indies Station after entering service in 1946. The ship remained at this station, at the except for returning to the United Kingdom for a return to service until 1952, when he joined a flotilla of frigates in the Home Fleet. 

After attending the Coronation Review in 1953, she joined the Fleet Reserve at Devonport. The ship was then transferred to Barry's Reserve Fleet Subdivision and placed on the destruction list for demolition by J Cashmore in Newport in Monmouth. It arrived in tow at the demolition site on 2 August 1960.

References

Further reading 
 
 
 
 
 

 

Black Swan-class sloops
Sloops of the United Kingdom
1945 ships